Whitewater Township is one of eight townships in Bollinger County, Missouri, USA. As of the 2000 U.S. Census, its population was 911. As of the 2010 U.S. Census, the population had increased to 1,029.

Whitewater Township was erected in 1872, and named after the nearby Whitewater River.

Demographics

As of the 2010 U.S. Census, there were 1,029 people living in the township. There were 438 households in the township. The racial makeup of the township was 99.13% White, 0.10% Native American, 0.10% from other races, and 0.68% from two or more races. Approximately 1.46% of the population were Hispanic or Latino of any race.

Geography

Incorporated Areas
The township contains one incorporated settlement: Sedgewickville.

Unincorporated Areas
The town contains the unincorporated area and historical community of Lixville.

Cemeteries
The township contains the eight following cemeteries: Bollinger, Flatwood, Grindstaff, Jones, Meyer, Old Bollinger, Shrum, and Statler.

Streams
The streams of Allie Creek, Bollinger Creek, Buck Creek, Caney Fork, Jack Creek, Little Muddy Creek, Shrum Creek, South Fork Apple Creek, and Wolf Creek flow through Whitewater Township. Other bodies of water located in the township include Richardet Lake and the Whitewater River.

Landmarks
There are no known landmarks in the township.

Administrative Districts

School Districts
Jackson R-II School District 
Meadow Heights R-II School District 
Oak Ridge R-VI School District 
Perry County 32 School District

References

 USGS Geographic Names Information System (GNIS)

External links
 US-Counties.com
 City-Data.com

Townships in Bollinger County, Missouri
Cape Girardeau–Jackson metropolitan area
Townships in Missouri